The Ramat HaSharon Hammers are an amateur American football team based in Ramat HaSharon, Israel, playing in the Israel Football League (IFL).

The Hammers were founded by former Tel Aviv Sabres Head Coach David Miller and were established in 2010 as the eighth expansion team to enter play in the IFL. In October 2010 the team became a part of the IFL and started playing its first season. With its first game, the team got an historical victory over the Jerusalem Kings 38–8.

History

2010–11 season
The team played 10 regular-season games and in its first season and had a 3–7 record. The team won against the Jerusalem Kings and twice against the Haifa Underdogs
The Hammers finished in 3rd place in the North Division and qualified to the IFL Playoffs, in the quarter finals the team met the Tel Aviv Pioneers and lost.

2011–2012 season
The team Played 10 regular season games and in its second season and had a 3–7 record. Won twice against the new "Northern Starts" and against the Be'er Sheva black swarm 
The Hammers finished in 4th place in the North Division and did not make the IFL Playoffs.

Stadium
In the early days of the 2012–2013 season, the Hammers officially moved to Ramat HaSharon, and ever since, the Hammers have been the local team. The Hammers play in the Ramat HaSharon soccer field, on the crossing of "Derech Dudu Dotan" and "Hativat Alexandroni".

References

External links
 The Hammers Official Website
 The Hammers at Official IFL Website
 IFL Official Website

American football teams in Israel
Sport in Ramat HaSharon
American football teams established in 2010
2010 establishments in Israel